Richard Warren was a Mayflower passenger.

Richard Warren may also refer to:

Richard Warren (Australian politician) (1869–1940), member of the Queensland Legislative Assembly
Richard Warren (Irish politician) (died 1735), member of the Irish House of Commons
Richard Warren (Jacobite) (1705–1775), Irish Jacobite soldier
Richard Warren (musician) (born 1973), British musician, songwriter and producer
Richard Warren (physician) (1731–1797), English society doctor
Richard Warren (Royal Navy officer) (1806–1875), Royal Navy officer
Richard Benson Warren (1784-1848), Irish barrister
Rick Warren (born 1954), American evangelical Christian pastor and author

See also